The 4th Annual Grammy Awards were held on May 29, 1962, at Chicago, Los Angeles and New York. They recognized accomplishments by musicians from the year 1961. Henry Mancini won 5 awards.

Award winners
Record of the Year
Henry Mancini for "Moon River"
Album of the Year (other than classical)
Judy Garland for Judy at Carnegie Hall
Song of the Year
Henry Mancini & Johnny Mercer (songwriters) for "Moon River" performed by Henry Mancini
Best New Artist
Peter Nero

Children's
Best Recording for Children
Leonard Bernstein (conductor) for Prokofiev: Peter and the Wolf performed by the New York Philharmonic Orchestra

Classical
Best Classical Performance - Orchestra
Charles Münch (conductor) & the Boston Symphony Orchestra for Ravel: Daphnis et Chloé
Best Classical Performance - Vocal Soloist (with or without orchestra)
Francesco Molinari-Pradelli (conductor), Joan Sutherland & the Royal Opera House Orchestra for The Art of the Prima Donna
Best Opera Recording
Gabriele Santini (conductor), Victoria de los Ángeles, Jussi Björling, Miriam Pirazzini, Mario Sereni & the Rome Opera Orchestra for Puccini: Madama Butterfly
Best Classical Performance - Choral (other than opera)
Robert Shaw (choir director) & the Robert Shaw Orchestra & Chorale for Bach: B Minor Mass
 Best Classical Performance - Instrumental Soloist (with orchestra)
Eugene Ormandy (conductor), Isaac Stern & the Philadelphia Orchestra  for Bartók: Violin Concerto No. 1
Best Classical Performance - Instrumental Soloist or Duo (without orchestra)
Laurindo Almeida for Reverie for Spanish Guitar
Best Classical Performance - Chamber Music
Jascha Heifetz, Gregor Piatigorsky & William Primrose for Beethoven: Serenade, Op. 8/Kodály: Duo for Violin and Cello, Op. 7
Best Contemporary Classical Composition
Laurindo Almeida (composer and artist) for Discantus
Igor Stravinsky (composer and artist) for Stravinsky: Movements for Piano and Orchestra
Album of the Year - Classical
Igor Stravinsky (conductor) & the Columbia Symphony Orchestra for Stravinsky Conducts 1960: Le Sacre du Printemps; Petrushka

Comedy
Best Comedy Performance
Elaine May & Mike Nichols for An Evening with Mike Nichols and Elaine May

Composing and arranging
Best Instrumental Theme or Instrumental Version of Song
Galt MacDermot for "African Waltz" performed by Cannonball Adderley
Best Sound Track Album or Recording of Score from Motion Picture or Television
Henry Mancini (composer) for Breakfast at Tiffany's
Best Arrangement
Henry Mancini (arranger & artist) for "Moon River"

Country
Best Country & Western Recording
Jimmy Dean for Big Bad John

Folk
Best Folk Recording
The Belafonte Folk Singers for Belafonte Folk Singers at Home and Abroad

Gospel
Best Gospel or Other Religious Recording 
Mahalia Jackson for Everytime I Feel the Spirit

Jazz
Best Jazz Performance - Soloist or Small Group (Instrumental)
André Previn for André Previn Plays Harold Arlen
Best Jazz Performance - Large Group (Instrumental)
Stan Kenton for Kenton's West Side Story
Best Original Jazz Composition
Galt MacDermot (composer) for "African Waltz" performed by Cannonball Adderley

Musical show
 Best Original Cast Show Album
Frank Loesser (composer) & the original cast with Robert Morse, Rudy Vallee, Charles Nelson Reilly, Bonnie Scott, Claudette Southerland & Sammy Smith for How to Succeed in Business Without Really Trying
Best Sound Track Album or Recording of Original Cast From a Motion Picture or Television
Irwin Kostal, Johnny Green, Saul Chaplin, Sid Ramin (music directors) & the original cast for West Side Story

Packaging and notes
Best Album Cover - Classical
Marvin Schwartz (art director) for Puccini: Madama Butterfly performed by the Rome Opera Orchestra conducted by Gabriele Santini
Best Album Cover - Other Than Classical
Jim Silke (art director) for Judy at Carnegie Hall performed by Judy Garland

Pop
Best Solo Vocal Performance, Female
Judy Garland for Judy at Carnegie Hall
Best Solo Vocal Performance, Male
Jack Jones for "Lollipops and Roses"
Best Performance by a Vocal Group
Lambert, Hendricks & Ross for High Flying
Best Performance by a Chorus
Johnny Mann for Great Band With Great Voices performed by the Johnny Mann Singers and the Si Zentner Orchestra
Best Performance by an Orchestra - for Dancing
Si Zentner for  Up a Lazy River
Best Performance by an Orchestra - for Other Than Dancing
Henry Mancini for Breakfast at Tiffany's
Best Rock and Roll Recording
Chubby Checker for "Let's Twist Again"

Production and engineering
Best Engineering Contribution - Popular Recording
Robert Arnold (engineer) for Judy at Carnegie Hall performed by Judy Garland
Best Engineering Contribution - Classical Recording
Lewis W. Layton (engineer), Charles Münch (conductor) & the Boston Symphony Orchestra for Ravel: Daphnis et Chloé
Best Engineering Contribution - Novelty
John Kraus (engineer) for Stan Freberg Presents the United States of America performed by Stan Freberg

R&B
Best Rhythm & Blues Performance 
Ray Charles for "Hit the Road Jack"

Spoken
Best Documentary or Spoken Word Recording (other than comedy)
Leonard Bernstein for Humor in Music

References

 004
1962 in Los Angeles
1962 in Illinois
1962 in New York City
1962 music awards
1960s in Chicago
Events in Los Angeles
Events in New York City
1962 in American music
May 1962 events in the United States
Events in Chicago